This article is a discography of the jazz-funk fusion group Fattburger.

Discography

Notable Singles

External links
Fattburger Discography at Smooth Jazz Club
Fattburger Discography at RollingStone
Fattburger at Google Music
Fattburger Discography and Music at CD Universe
Fattburger RSS Feeds at Rhapsody
Steve Laury Discography at Google Music

Discographies of American artists

Jazz discographies